Alexander Michael Loughton (born 3 May 1983) is an Australian professional basketball player for the Cairns Marlins of the NBL1 North.

Junior and college career
As a junior, Loughton played basketball with the Wanneroo Basketball Association. He played for the Wolves' SBL team between 2000 and 2002, while also spending a season with the Australian Institute of Sport in the SEABL in 2001. Additionally, with the Australian Under-20 team, he averaged 17.4 points and 10.3 rebounds.

In 2002, Loughton moved to the United States to play college basketball for Old Dominion University. In 124 games over four seasons, he made 120 starts and averaged 13.3 points, 7.7 rebounds, 1.5 assists and 1.3 steals in 28.1 minutes per game. As a junior in 2004–05, he was named CAA Player of the Year. In October 2009, Loughton was named to the CAA's 25th Anniversary Team. Three months later, he was named to the Collegeinsider.com Mid Major All-Decade team.

Professional career

Early career (2006–2010)
After going undrafted in the 2006 NBA draft, Loughton played for the Orlando Magic during the Pepsi Pro Summer League. He later moved to Spain to begin his professional career, joining Aguas Gandia for the 2006–07 season, where he averaged 15.5 points, 5.7 rebounds and 1.1 assists in 34 games.

In April 2007, Loughton signed a two-year deal with the Perth Wildcats. During his time in Perth, he had short stints with the Wanneroo Wolves in 2008 and 2009.

In September 2009, Loughton returned to Spain, signing with Ourense Baloncesto for the 2009–10 season.

Cairns Taipans and Cairns Marlins (2010–present)
Loughton joined the Cairns Taipans in 2010, where he remained for the next nine years. In his first season with the Taipans, he helped them reach the 2011 NBL Grand Final, where they lost 2–1 to the New Zealand Breakers. In 2015, he helped the Taipans win their first ever minor premiership and reach their second NBL Grand Final, where they again lost to the Breakers, this time in straight sets.

In 2016, Loughton helped the Cairns Marlins win the QBL championship.

In March 2017, Loughton joined the Perth Redbacks of the State Basketball League, where he had a three-week, four-game stint. He subsequently returned to Cairns and re-joined the Marlins as an injury replacement for Stephen Weigh. Loughton returned to the Redbacks in 2018 for another short stint.

In January 2019, Loughton played his 300th NBL game. On 2 February 2019, he announced he would be retiring from the NBL at the conclusion of the 2018–19 season.

In 2021, Loughton returned to play for the Marlins in the new NBL1 North competition.

Personal
Loughton and his wife Michelle have three children: Liam, Georgia and Ivy.

Loughton has a video and social media production business called Power Forward Media.

References

External links
Cairns Taipans profile
Old Dominion bio

1983 births
Living people
Australian expatriate basketball people in Spain
Australian expatriate basketball people in the United States
Australian men's basketball players
Cairns Taipans players
Centers (basketball)
Club Ourense Baloncesto players
Old Dominion Monarchs men's basketball players
Perth Wildcats players
Power forwards (basketball)
Basketball players from Perth, Western Australia